Jack Randall may refer to:

Jack Randall (boxer) (1794-1828), British boxer
Jack Randall (actor) (Addison Randall, 1906-1945), American actor 
Jack Randall (footballer) (born 1992), English footballer
Jack Randall (ichthyologist) (1924-2020)
Jack Randall, main character in Spares by Michael Marshall Smith
Jack Randall (character), from Diana Gabaldon's Outlander series

See also
John Randall (disambiguation)